is a Japanese actress. She played the role of Yuri/Time Pink in the 2000 Super Sentai series Mirai Sentai Timeranger.

Biography
Katsumura started stage activities at a local in Tokyo after graduating as a junior in high school. In 1997, in the stage name , she debuted in the film Bounce Ko Gals. After half a year, Katsumura returned to her hometown, and then returned with her current name, working as an actress. She appeared in the Super Sentai series Mirai Sentai Timeranger and the variety show Men B.

In 2001, Katsumura participated in the self-produced film Enji-ya, which was published in the year. She was co-starred with Timeranger actors Masahiro Kuranuki and Shinji Kasahara.

On January 17, 2006, Katsumura married to actor Yūsuke Tomoi; the same year on August 7, she gave birth to a girl. She had a maternity leave after her marriage announcement on March 31, 2007; she quit her agency Versatile Entertainment to focus on her child care.

In May 2007, Katsumura started her own blog, other to reflect to her daughter, but also show her willingness to her entertainment activities.

In October 2008, she resumed to performing acting activities while belonging to her new agency, Asterisk.

In an unknown date of 2014 she left Asterisk and she permanently retired from the Entertainment industry leaving her final fate and whereabouts unknown as the blog she used closed in 2020.

Filmography

TV series

Films

References

External links
 Official profile at Asterisk 
 Official blog 

Japanese actresses
1980 births
Living people
Actors from Ibaraki Prefecture